Park Je-Chun (Hangul: 박제천) is a South Korean poet.

Life
Park Je-chung was born in Seoul, Korea on March 23, 1945. Park graduated from Dongguk University in 1966 and immediately debuted as a poet in the Hyundai Munhak monthly. Park became a member of the literary coterie Poetic Thought in 1983 and in 1995 helped to found the magazine Literary Academy, for which he served as publisher and editor. He has also taught at Kyonggi University and served as an official of the Korean Culture and Arts Foundation.

Work
The Korea Literature Translation Institute has summarized Park's contributions to Korean literature:

His first volume of poetry The Poem of a Mature Man (Jangjasi, 1975) was not entirely successful in sustaining poetic intensity despite rhetorical flourish and sensuous language. If The Poem of a Mature Man failed to reach maturity, his second and third volumes of poetry, The Law of Heart (Simbeop, 1979) and The Law (Yul, 1981) respectively, make apparent that the poet is striving towards poetic maturity, abandoning flowery language to reflect upon the Buddhist world of goodness with solemnity and care. At the Moonless Buddhist Temple (Dareun jeumeun garame) and Further Than Darkness (Eodumboda meolli) show greater depth and breadth in the poet’s language and his contemplation upon the world. In his latest volume of poetry, SF-Sympathy (SF-gyogam, 2001), Park delves into the crisis of poetry and of the literary arts at large brought on by the proliferation of visual media in the 20th century. Park’s poetic imagination has evolved beyond mere contemplation on self to embrace individual as a part of larger group. With expansive worldview, Park continues to explore the meaning of poetry in the modern world.

Works in Translation
 La Canción del dragón y otros poemas (박제천 시선)

Works in Korean (Partial)
Collections of Poetry
 Taoist Poems 
 Laws of the Mind
 The Third Star
 The Moon Over the Darkening Sea
 Farther than the Darkness
 Dreaming Prints
 The Autumn of my 23rd Year
 Your Name, My Poems
 Flower of the Sky
 In the Twelve Hells of the Blue Star
Collections of Critical Essays
 Wings of the Seoul
 Lectures on Poetry Composition
 Methods of Poetry Composition
Essays
 Selections from the Jade Mirror of Mind
 Discourses on Herbs and Roots
 The Flame of a Dream-Filled Life
 The Fountains of the Heart

Awards
 Hyundai Munhak Literary Award (1979)
 Prize for Poetry of Korean Poet's Association (1981)
 Nokwon Literary Award (1983)
 Woltan Literary Award (1987)
 Yun Tong-ju Literary Prize (1989)
 Dongguk University Literary Prize (1991)

References 

1945 births
Korean writers
Living people
International Writing Program alumni
Society of Korean Poets Award winners